Crocomela theophrastus is a moth of the subfamily Arctiinae. It was described by Hering in 1926. It is found in Brazil.

References

Arctiinae
Moths described in 1926